Sailing the Seas of Cheese is the second studio album and major-label debut by the American rock band Primus, released on May 14, 1991. It spawned three singles: "Jerry Was a Race Car Driver", "Tommy the Cat", and "Those Damned Blue-Collar Tweekers". "Jerry Was a Race Car Driver" appeared in the video games ATV Offroad Fury, Tony Hawk's Pro Skater, Rock Band 3, The Bigs, and as downloadable content for Rocksmith 2014, while "American Life" appears in Tony Hawk's Project 8.

Album information
 "Jerry Was a Race Car Driver" contains a sample from the movie The Texas Chainsaw Massacre 2 in which the character Chop Top exclaims "Dog will hunt!"
 "Los Bastardos" contains samples from the BBC television series The Young Ones including Vyvyan shouting, "Shut up, you bastards!", Vyvyan's mother saying, "He is a bastard isn't he?", as well as Rick saying, "You just called me a bastard, didn't you?" and "Mike, you bastard!"
 The lyrics "sail the seas of cheese" from "Seas of Cheese" would later appear in the song "DMV" on their next album Pork Soda, as well as the song "Dirty Drowning Man" on 1999's Antipop. 
 The song "Eleven" is in an unusual time-signature of 11/8, hence the name.
 Due to the complex nature of some of the basslines in "Tommy The Cat", there is not a clear consensus on exactly what notes are being played, and as a result, dozens of different interpretations exist.

Live performance
The album was performed live in its entirety in 2003 and 2004 on their Tour De Fromage, on December 30, 2010 and once more during a two night show at Royal Albert Hall in April 2012.

Critical reception

Reviewing the album for AllMusic, Steve Huey contends that "Sailing the Seas of Cheese completely redefined the possibilities of the electric bass in rock music for those who'd never heard the group before." He describes the album as "mostly riff-driven, fleshing out their heavy metal roots with prog rock tricks from Rush and Frank Zappa, as well as the novelty side of Zappa's sense of humor." He notes that "the willful goofiness may alienate some listeners, but... it never detracts from the band's frequently stunning musicianship" and concludes that this album is "the tightest, most song-oriented representation of their jaw-dropping, one-of-a-kind style." Simon Reynolds reviews the album for Entertainment Weekly by describing Primus as "too self-consciously goofy for their own good, but their rubber-boned thrash-funk can be cartoonish fun."

In a 2015 Noisey interview, Les Claypool ranked Sailing the Seas of Cheese as his second favorite Primus album behind Frizzle Fry, believing the work to be "probably [Primus'] most respected album". In addition, Claypool also outlined the experience of releasing the record on a major label, and the consequent inspiration for the album's title, when he remarked:

But [Sailing the Seas of Cheese] was also that record like 'Here we are, about to release something on a major label,' and we're right alongside the other bands that were popular at the time, which were these hairball bands—the Poisons, and the Guns N' Roses, and these different things that we just did not fit in with. That was the impetus of the title, because we just knew all of a sudden we were going to be thrust into this world where we weren't sure anyone thought we belonged.

Release history
Sailing the Seas of Cheese reached Gold status in March 1993. It was certified platinum in December 2001.

2009
Plain Recordings released a 180 gram version of the LP.

2013 reissue
A deluxe edition of the album was released on May 21, 2013. It is available in two six-panel Digipak configurations, each featuring the album’s new stereo mix on CD and the new 5.1 surround mix on Blu-ray or DVD, plus three exclusive, previously unreleased bonus tracks, and liner notes by music journalist Greg Prato.” Claypool stated, “Musically, it holds up incredibly well. Sonically, it holds up fairly well. There’s some old-style reverbs that are a little bit syrupy. With modern technology, we can fix some of that stuff. But we don’t want to mess with it too much, because it is what it is. We want to fatten it up a little bit.”

Track listing

Personnel

Primus
Les Claypool - vocals, electric bass, string bass, six-string fretless bass, clarinet
Larry LaLonde - electric guitar, six-string banjo
Tim "Herb" Alexander - drums, percussion, water jug
Jay Lane - drums (on tracks 13, 14 & 15)

Production
Chris Bellman – mastering
Mike Bordin – two-skinned foreskin drum
Adam Gates – additional fisherman
Lance Link – additional fisherman
Primus – producer
Ron Rigler – engineering
Trouz – whistle
Tom Whalley – A&R director
Tom Waits – voice of Tommy the Cat
Matt Winegar – accordion, guitar

Visual Art
Paul Haggard – jacket design, photography
Mark Kohr – cheese coordinator, scenery
Michael Lavine – band photo
Mitch Romanowski – ship (sculpture)
Snap – airbrushing

Bastardos
Drums: Brain Mantia, Mike Bordin, Herb
Guitars: MIRV Haggard, Todd Huth, Derek Greenberg, Matt Winegar, Ler
Bass: Butthouse, Adam Gates, Les
Vocals: Adam Gates, Puffster, Herb, Ler, Les

Charts

References

1991 albums
Albums with cover art by Lance Montoya
Funk metal albums
Interscope Records albums
Primus (band) albums